Friar Nicolás Borrás (1530–1610) was a Spanish Renaissance Catholic monk and painter, active in Valencia.

Biography 
Borrás was born in Cocentaina, (Kingdom of Valencia), nowadays in the Province of Alicante. He is one of the best artists of Valencian monastic painting. Going to Valencia at an early age to study under Vicente Juan Macip, he became the latter's most noteworthy pupil. Borrás's works generally resemble those of Macip and some of them have been taken for his. Upon entering the priesthood he was assigned to the Hieronymite Monastery of Saint Jerome of Cotalba, in Gandia where he enjoyed his stay so much that he asked for membership in the order has his only payment.

The Hieronymite monks of Cotalba called him to paint the greater altarpiece of the church. In this way, he entered in the order. The altarpiece consisted in fourteen tables. There was a sculpture of Saint Jerome in the middle. In addition, he made other altarpieces for the chapels of the church and the chapterhouse. Also he produced paintings for different parts of the monastery. He painted four great linens for the stations of the low cloister. However, the only work conserved in its original place was The Saint Supper painted in fresco. It is placed in what nowadays is known as the oil mill, that originally was the dining hall (refectory).

He received the habit in 1575, and took the final vows the following year. Three years later, he spent some time with the Capuchins at the Franciscan monastery of San Juan de Ribera, near Valencia. He was soon back, however, at the Monastery of Saint Jerome of Cotalba in Gandia, where he passed the rest of his life painting, leaving twelve altar pieces in the church alone. He also spent his own money in the employment of sculptors and builders for the embellishment of the monastery.

Borrás also did much work for churches and religious houses in Valencia, Madrid, and elsewhere. His paintings appeared in Saint Mary of Valencia Cathedral and at the Hieronymite monastery in the city of San Miguel de los Reyes where there was a "Christ at the Column", and a picture of the painter in adoration of "The Holy Virgin". Others were in the church of St. Stephen in Gandia, in the Escorial in Aldaia, and in Ontinyent. In the Museum of Fine Arts of Valencia there are some fifty paintings by Borrás chiefly from Gandia and San Miguel. Among them are The Last Supper, Christ Bearing His Cross, The Dead Saviour in the Arms of the Eternal Father, and The Archangel Michael Driving Souls into Purgatory and Hell. In the last Borrás is supposed to have pictured himself as a white-robed monk kneeling on the brink. He died, aged about 80, in the Monastery of Sant Jeroni de Cotalba, near Gandia.

See also 
Monastery of Saint Jerome of Cotalba
Hieronymites

Notes

Bibliography
Benito Domenech, Fernando, Los Ribalta y la pintura valenciana de su tiempo, Valencia-Madrid, 1987,  p. 34-43.
Benito Domenech, Fernando, ed. Cinco siglos de pintura valenciana (Five Centuries of Valencian Paintings), Obras del Museo de Bellas Artes de Valencia, Madrid, Museo de Bellas Artes de Valencia-Fundación Central Hispano, 1996, 
Various authors, Nicolás Borrás Falcó, Ayuntamiento de Cocentaina (Alicante), 2010, 187 pages
 Mateo Gómez, Isabel, López-Yarto, Amelia y Prados García, José María, El arte de la Orden Jerónima: historia y mecenazgo, Madrid, Encuentro, 2000, .

External links 
The paintings of Nicolás Borrás in the Monastery of Sant Jeroni de Cotalba 
Files of Nicolás Borrás at the Museum of Fine Arts of Valencia
}
 Valencia Art exhibit
Gerard William Smith (1884), Painting, Spanish and French, Sampson and Low publishers, editors EJ Poynter and Roger Smith, page 37.

1530 births
1610 deaths
People from Cocentaina
Painters from the Valencian Community
Monastery of Sant Jeroni de Cotalba
16th-century Spanish painters
Spanish male painters
17th-century Spanish painters